The 2019 Bangladesh Premier League Final was a day/night Twenty20 cricket match played between Comilla Victorians and Dhaka Dynamites on 8 February 2019 at the Sher-e-Bangla National Cricket Stadium, Dhaka to determine the winner of the 2018–19 Bangladesh Premier League, a professional Twenty20 cricket league in Bangladesh. It ended as Comilla Victorians defeating Dhaka Dynamites by 17 runs.

Route to final

League stage

Note: The points at the end of each group match are listed.
Note: Click on the points to see the summary for the match.

Play-offs

Eliminator

Qualifiers
Qualifier 1

Qualifier 2

Final

Background
The match has been played at Sher-e-Bangla National Cricket Stadium. The top two teams Rangpur Riders and Comilla Victorians faced each other in the Qualifier 1 and Comilla Victorians entered directly to final winning the Qualifier 1 while the Rangpur Riders got another chance to make their position in final going through Qualifier 2, played between the former and the winner of the Eliminator, Dhaka Dynamites who defeated Chittagong Vikings in the Eliminator. But Dhaka made it to final defeating Rangpur in the Qualifier 2.

Report
Dhaka winning the toss decided to field first and their decision seemed to have worked when the picked up Evin Lewis so cheaply but Tamim Iqbal then made a partnership of 89 runs with Anamul Haque and in the process he picked up his fifty in 39 balls. Both Anamul Haque and Shamshur Rahman fell in a quick succession while the latter got out on a Golden duck. Further no damage was done for Comilla, Tamim Iqbal along with the skipper Imrul Kayes made a 100 run partnership for the 4th wicket, in the process Tamim scored his first-ever century in BPL and it was also his highest individual score in  T20 cricket along with that first time any Bangladeshi batsman scored a century in a T20 cricket final.

In the chase Dhaka lost the wicket of Sunil Narine in the second ball of the innings as he got run out without facing any delivery (Platinum Duck). Upul Tharanga and Rony Talukdar made 102 run partnership for the 2nd wicket. After the fall of Tharanga and Talukdars's wicket no batsman could stand up with the bat and wicket kept falling on regular succession and in their full over quota Dhaka could only manage 182 runs losing 9 wickets and subsequently lost the match by 17 runs. As a result Comilla hold their second BPL title.

Summary
Tamim Iqbal was elected Man of the Match for his match winning century (141*) which was highest individual score in T20 cricket. While Shakib Al Hasan was elected Player of the Tournament for his all-round performance. Rilee Rossouw of Rangpur Riders was the most run getter in the tournament while Shakib Al Hasan, the skipper of Dhaka Dynamites was the most wicket taker.

References

External links

2018 in Bangladeshi cricket
Bangladesh Premier League Finals